A Performance work statement (or PWS) is used to summarize the work that needs to be done for a contract (e.g., with the U.S. Department of Defense).

A PWS usually requires a scope, applicable documents, performance requirements/tasks, and contractor quality assurance for acquisition.

References

 https://www.atsc.army.mil/TADLP/content/pws/index.asp
 https://dap.dau.mil/acquipedia/Pages/ArticleDetails.aspx?aid=488854b0-d8ee-4e32-aa3e-301d2ac8ffca

Government procurement in the United States